The 1996–97 Montana Grizzlies basketball team represented the University of Montana during the 1996–97 NCAA Division I basketball season. The Grizzlies were led by sixth-year head coach Blaine Taylor and played their home games on campus at Adams Fieldhouse in Missoula, Montana.

They finished the regular season at 19–10, with an  record in conference to finish second in the regular season standings. The Grizzlies earned an automatic berth to the NCAA tournament by winning the Big Sky Conference tournament.

In the opening round of the NCAA Tournament at the Jon M. Huntsman Center in Salt Lake City, Utah, Montana faced the No. 1 seed and defending champion Kentucky. The Grizzlies were beaten handily, 92–54, by the eventual National runner-up.

Postseason results

|-
!colspan=9 style=| Big Sky tournament

|-
!colspan=9 style=| NCAA tournament

References

Montana Grizzlies basketball seasons
Montana
Montana